The Degenhardts is a 1944 German drama film directed by Werner Klingler and starring Heinrich George, Ernst Schröder and Gunnar Möller. Karl Degenhardt, the patriarch of a family in Lübeck, leads his wife and five children through the opening stages of Second World War culminating in the Bombing of Lübeck on 28 March 1942 by the Royal Air Force.

The film was part of a cycle of home front films produced in Germany during the war. 
The film was intended to fan anti-British sentiment and prepare Germans psychologically for the destruction of their cities by Allied bombing raids and invasions. It premiered in Lübeck on 6 July 1944.

Cast
 Heinrich George as Karl Degenhardt
 Ernst Schröder as Jochem Degenhardt
 Gunnar Möller
 Ernst Legal
 Renée Stobrawa
 Wolfgang Lukschy
 Heinz Klingenberg
 Knut Hartwig
 Günther Körner
 Walter Bechmann
 Robert Forsch
 Herwart Grosse
 William Huch
 Hilde Jansen
 Karl Kemper
 Werner Kepich
 Alfred Maack
 Ilse Petri
 Werner Pledath
 Trude Tandar
 Erich Ziegel

References

Bibliography
 O'Brien, Mary-Elizabeth. Nazi Cinema as Enchantment. The Politics of Entertainment in the Third Reich. Camden House, 2006.

External links

1944 films
German drama films
Films of Nazi Germany
1940s German-language films
Films directed by Werner Klingler
World War II films made in wartime
Nazi propaganda films
Films set on the home front during World War II
German black-and-white films
Tobis Film films
1944 drama films
1940s German films
1930s German films